Round Lake, also spelled Roundlake, is an unincorporated community located in Bolivar County, Mississippi, United States along Mississippi Highway 1. Round Lake is located on the former Yazoo and Mississippi Valley Railroad. Round Lake was formerly home to three general stores and two grocery stores.

A post office operated under the name Roundlake from 1891 to 1968.

References

Unincorporated communities in Bolivar County, Mississippi
Unincorporated communities in Mississippi